Brynmill railway station served the suburb of Brynmill, in the historical county of Glamorgan, Wales, from 1807 to 1960 on the Swansea and Mumbles Railway.

History
The station was opened on 25 March 1807 by the Oystermouth Railway. Like the rest of the stations on the line, the first services were horse-drawn. It closed in 1827 but it reopened on 25 July 1860. It was known as Water Works or Waterworks Halt in most publications but it was later changed to Bryn Mill Road in the 1878 edition of Dickson. It was also known as Brynmill Road in the 1885 and 1886 editions of the Cambrian timetable and Brynmill in the 1893 and 1894 editions of Bradshaw. The station closed along with the line on 6 January 1960.

References

Disused railway stations in Swansea
Railway stations in Great Britain opened in 1893
Railway stations in Great Britain closed in 1960
1960 disestablishments in Wales